Todd Priaulx is an international lawn bowler from Guernsey.

Bowls career
Priaulx represented Guernsey at the 2014 Commonwealth Games and the 2018 Commonwealth Games. The following year in 2015, he won the singles bronze medal at the Atlantic Bowls Championships.

In 2019, he won two gold medals at the European Bowls Championships. In 2022, he competed in the men's singles and the men's pairs at the 2022 Commonwealth Games.

References

Guernsey male bowls players
Living people
1988 births
Bowls European Champions
Bowls players at the 2022 Commonwealth Games